The 2010 Texas Longhorns baseball team represented the Texas Longhorns baseball program for the University of Texas in the 2010 NCAA Division I baseball season.  Augie Garrido coached the team in his 14th season at Texas.

Texas finished the regular season with a Big 12 Regular Season title, their 6th in the Big 12. Texas hosted TCU for the Super Regional Round, falling to TCU in 3 games.

Texas outfielder Connor Rowe was named to the 2010 Big 12 Conference baseball tournament All-Tournament Team. P Taylor Jungmann, C Cameron Rupp, SS Brandon Loy, OF Kevin Keyes, and DH Russel Moldenhauer were named to the NCAA Austin Regional All-Tournament Team.

Personnel

Roster

Coaches

Schedule

Postseason

Big 12 tournament

NCAA tournament

Rankings

References

Texas Longhorns baseball seasons
Texas Longhorns Baseball
Texas Longhorns
Texas